Kazakhstan competed at the 1994 Winter Paralympics in Lillehammer, Norway. Two competitors from Kazakhstan competed in two biathlon events and six cross-country skiing events. In total Kazakhstan won a single silver medal and finished 20th in the medal table.

Medalists

See also 
 Kazakhstan at the Paralympics
 Kazakhstan at the 1994 Winter Olympics

References 

Kazakhstan at the Paralympics
1994 in Kazakhstani sport
Nations at the 1994 Winter Paralympics